Nannizzia fulva is a species of fungus. It is a heterothallic species.

References

Further reading

External links

Arthrodermataceae